Christopher Gustavus Memminger (January 9, 1803 – March 7, 1888) was a German-born American politician and a secessionist who participated in the formation of the Confederate States government. He was the principal author of the Provisional Constitution (1861), as well as the founder of the Confederate financial system. As the first Confederate States Secretary of the Treasury, Memminger was the principal author of the economic policies of Jefferson Davis's administration.

Early life and career 
Christopher Gustavus Memminger was born on January 9, 1803, in Vaihingen,  Wuerttemberg  (present-day Stuttgart-Vaihingen,  Germany). His father, Gottfried Memminger, was a military officer who died a month after his son's birth. His mother, Eberhardina (née Kohler) Memminger, immigrated to Charleston, South Carolina, but died of yellow fever in 1807. Christopher was placed in an orphanage. His fortunes changed when, at the age of eleven, he was taken under the care of Thomas Bennett, a prominent lawyer and future Governor. He entered South Carolina College at the age of 12 and graduated second in his class at 16. Memminger passed the bar in 1825 and became a successful lawyer. He married Mary Withers Wilkinson in 1832.

He was a leader of the opponents during the Nullification Crisis. He published The Book of Nullification (1832–33), which satirized the advocates of the doctrine in biblical style. He entered state politics and served in the South Carolina state legislature from 1836 to 1852 and 1854 to 1860, where for nearly twenty years he was the head of the finance committee. Memminger was a staunch advocate of education and helped give Charleston one of the most comprehensive public school systems in the country. In 1859, after John Brown's raid, he was commissioned by South Carolina to consult with other delegates in Virginia as to the best method of warding off attacks of abolitionists.

American Civil War 

Memminger was considered a moderate on the secession issue, but after the election of Abraham Lincoln, he decided that secession was necessary. Memminger enslaved 12 people (six men), listed in his estate in the Charleston, South Carolina, census of 1850. His estate was in Henderson County, North Carolina, where he built his Connemara summer home). When South Carolina seceded from the United States in 1860, Memminger was asked to write the Declaration of the Immediate Causes Which Induce and Justify the Secession of South Carolina from the Federal Union, which outlined the reasons for secession. When other states declared secession, he was selected as a South Carolina delegate to the Provisional Congress of the Confederate States. He was the chair of the committee which drafted the Provisional Constitution of the Confederate States. The twelve-man committee produced a provisional constitution in only four days.

When Jefferson Davis formed his first cabinet, Memminger was appointed Secretary of the Treasury on February 21, 1861. It was a difficult task in view of the Confederacy's financial challenges. He attempted to finance the government initially by bonds and tariffs (and the confiscation of gold from the United States Mint in New Orleans). Still, he soon found himself forced to more extreme measures such as income taxes and fiat currency. He had been a supporter of hard currency before the war but found himself issuing increasingly-devalued paper money, which had become worth less than 2% of its face value in gold by the end of the war.

Later life 
Memminger resigned as Secretary of the Treasury on July 1, 1864, and was replaced by fellow South Carolinian George Trenholm. He returned to his summer residence in Flat Rock, North Carolina. In the post-war years, he returned to Charleston, received a presidential pardon in 1866, and returned to private law practice and business investment. He also continued his work on developing South Carolina's public education system and was voted to a final term in the state legislature in 1877. Memminger died on March 7, 1888, at age 85, in Charleston, South Carolina.

Notable works

Honors 
Christopher Memminger was featured on the Confederate $5.00 bill.

See also 
List of German Americans
List of orphans and foundlings
List of people from Stuttgart

Notes

References

Further reading

External links 

 Official
 C. G. Memminger Papers at the University of North Carolina at Chapel Hill
 General information
 
 Christopher Memminger at The Historical Marker Database (HMdb.org)
 Christopher Memminger at South Carolina Encyclopedia (scencyclopedia.org)
 Christopher Memminger at NCpedia (ncpedia.org)
 Christopher Memminger at The Political Graveyard
 
 

1803 births
1888 deaths
19th-century American Episcopalians
19th-century American lawyers
19th-century American politicians
19th-century American writers
19th-century American male writers
American adoptees
American lawyers admitted to the practice of law by reading law
American male non-fiction writers
American political writers
Burials in North Carolina
Confederate States Department of the Treasury officials
Executive members of the Cabinet of the Confederate States of America
Deaths in North Carolina
Deputies and delegates to the Provisional Congress of the Confederate States
Economists from North Carolina
Economists from South Carolina
Democratic Party members of the South Carolina House of Representatives
German emigrants to the United States
People from Flat Rock, Henderson County, North Carolina
People of South Carolina in the American Civil War
Recipients of American presidential pardons
Signers of the Confederate States Constitution
Signers of the Provisional Constitution of the Confederate States
South Carolina lawyers
University of South Carolina alumni
Writers from Charleston, South Carolina
Württemberger emigrants to the United States
19th-century pseudonymous writers
American white supremacists